Rangsi may refer to:
Rangsi, Rolpa, in Rolpa District in Nepal
Rangsi, Rukum, in Rukum District in Nepal